In mathematics, topological groups are logically the combination of groups and topological spaces, i.e. they are groups and topological spaces at the same time, such that the continuity condition for the group operations connects these two structures together and consequently they are not independent from each other.

Topological groups have been studied extensively in the period of 1925 to 1940. Haar and Weil (respectively in 1933 and 1940) showed that the integrals and Fourier series are special cases of a very wide class of topological groups.

Topological groups, along with continuous group actions, are used to study continuous symmetries, which have many applications, for example, in physics. In functional analysis, every topological vector space is an additive topological group with the additional property that scalar multiplication is continuous; consequently, many results from the theory of topological groups can be applied to functional analysis.

Formal definition 

A topological group, is a topological space that is also a group such that the group operation (in this case product):
,  
and the inversion map:
,  
are continuous. 
Here  is viewed as a topological space with the product topology. 
Such a topology is said to be compatible with the group operations and is called a group topology.

Checking continuity

To show that a topology is compatible with the group operations, it suffices to check that the map
, 
is continuous. 

Additive notation

This definition used notation for multiplicative groups; 
the equivalent for additive groups would be that the following two operations are continuous: 
, 
, .

Hausdorffness

Although not part of this definition, many authors require that the topology on  be Hausdorff. 
One reason for this is that any topological group can be canonically associated with a Hausdorff topological group by taking an appropriate canonical quotient; 
this however, often still requires working with the original non-Hausdorff topological group.
Other reasons, and some equivalent conditions, are discussed below.

This article will not assume that topological groups are necessarily Hausdorff.

Category

In the language of category theory, topological groups can be defined concisely as group objects in the category of topological spaces, in the same way that ordinary groups are group objects in the category of sets. 
Note that the axioms are given in terms of the maps (binary product, unary inverse, and nullary identity), hence are categorical definitions.

Homomorphisms 

A homomorphism of topological groups means a continuous group homomorphism . 
Topological groups, together with their homomorphisms, form a category. 
A group homomorphism between topological groups is continuous if and only if it is continuous at some point.

An isomorphism of topological groups is a group isomorphism that is also a homeomorphism of the underlying topological spaces. 
This is stronger than simply requiring a continuous group isomorphism—the inverse must also be continuous. 
There are examples of topological groups that are isomorphic as ordinary groups but not as topological groups. 
Indeed, any non-discrete topological group is also a topological group when considered with the discrete topology. 
The underlying groups are the same, but as topological groups there is not an isomorphism.

Examples 

Every group can be trivially made into a topological group by considering it with the discrete topology; such groups are called discrete groups. 
In this sense, the theory of topological groups subsumes that of ordinary groups. 
The indiscrete topology (i.e. the trivial topology) also makes every group into a topological group.

The real numbers,  with the usual topology form a topological group under addition. 
Euclidean -space  is also a topological group under addition, and more generally, every topological vector space forms an (abelian) topological group. 
Some other examples of abelian topological groups are the circle group , or the torus  for any natural number .

The classical groups are important examples of non-abelian topological groups. For instance, the general linear group  of all invertible -by- matrices with real entries can be viewed as a topological group with the topology defined by viewing  as a subspace of Euclidean space . 
The orthogonal group is compact as a topological space.

The groups mentioned so far are all Lie groups, meaning that they are smooth manifolds in such a way that the group operations are smooth, not just continuous. 
Lie groups are the best-understood topological groups; many questions about Lie groups can be converted to purely algebraic questions about Lie algebras and then solved.

This is a countable space, and it does not have the discrete topology. 
An important example for number theory is the group  of p-adic integers, for a prime number , meaning the inverse limit of the finite groups  as n goes to infinity. 
The group  is well behaved in that it is compact (in fact, homeomorphic to the Cantor set), but it differs from (real) Lie groups in that it is totally disconnected. 

The group  is a pro-finite group; it is isomorphic to a subgroup of the product  in such a way that its topology is induced by the product topology, where the finite groups  are given the discrete topology. 
Another large class of pro-finite groups important in number theory are absolute Galois groups.

Some topological groups can be viewed as infinite dimensional Lie groups; this phrase is best understood informally, to include several different families of examples. 
For example, a topological vector space, such as a Banach space or Hilbert space, is an abelian topological group under addition. Some other infinite-dimensional groups that have been studied, with varying degrees of success, are loop groups, Kac–Moody groups, diffeomorphism groups, homeomorphism groups, and gauge groups.

In every Banach algebra with multiplicative identity, the set of invertible elements forms a topological group under multiplication. 
For example, the group of invertible bounded operators on a Hilbert space arises this way.

Properties

Translation invariance 

Consequently, for any  and  the subset  is open (resp. closed) in  if and only if this is true of its left translation  and right translation 
If  is a neighborhood basis of the identity element in a topological group  then for all 

In particular, any group topology on a topological group is completely determined by any neighborhood basis at the identity element. 

Symmetric neighborhoods 

A subset  is said to be symmetric if  where  
The closure of every symmetric set in a commutative topological group is symmetric. 

For any neighborhood  in a commutative topological group  of the identity element, there exists a symmetric neighborhood  of the identity element such that , where note that  is necessarily a symmetric neighborhood of the identity element. 
Thus every topological group has a neighborhood basis at the identity element consisting of symmetric sets.

Uniform space 

Every topological group can be viewed as a uniform space in two ways; the left uniformity turns all left multiplications into uniformly continuous maps while the right uniformity turns all right multiplications into uniformly continuous maps.
If  is not abelian, then these two need not coincide. 
The uniform structures allow one to talk about notions such as completeness, uniform continuity and uniform convergence on topological groups.

Separation properties 

If  is an open subset of a commutative topological group  and  contains a compact set , then there exists a neighborhood  of the identity element such that .

As a uniform space, every commutative topological group is completely regular. 
Consequently, for a multiplicative topological group  with identity element 1, the following are equivalent: 
 is a T0-space (Kolmogorov);
 is a T2-space (Hausdorff);
 is a T3 (Tychonoff);

A subgroup of a commutative topological group is discrete if and only if it has an isolated point.

If  is not Hausdorff, then one can obtain a Hausdorff group by passing to the quotient group , where  is the closure of the identity. 

Metrisability 

Let  be a topological group.

The Birkhoff–Kakutani theorem (named after mathematicians Garrett Birkhoff and Shizuo Kakutani) states that the following three conditions on a topological group  are equivalent:

  is metrisable (as a topological space).

Furthermore, the following are equivalent for any topological group :

  is a second countable locally compact (Hausdorff) space.
  is a Polish, locally compact (Hausdorff) space.
  is properly metrisable (as a topological space).

Note: As with the rest of the article we of assume here a Hausdorff topology.
The implications 4  3  2  1 hold in any topological space. In particular 3  2 holds, since in particular any properly metrisable space is countable union of compact metrisable and thus separable (cf. properties of compact metric spaces) subsets.
The non-trivial implication 1  4 was first proved by Raimond Struble in 1974. An alternative approach was made by Uffe Haagerup and Agata Przybyszewska in 2006,
the idea of the which is as follows:
One relies on the construction of a left-invariant metric, as in the case of first countable spaces. By local compactness, closed balls of sufficiently small radii are compact, and by normalising we can assume this holds for radius 1.

Subgroups 

Every subgroup of a topological group is itself a topological group when given the subspace topology. 

Quotients and normal subgroups 

The quotient map  is always open. 
Partly for this reason, it is natural to concentrate on closed subgroups when studying topological groups.

For example, the quotient group  is isomorphic to the circle group .

In any topological group, the identity component (i.e., the connected component containing the identity element) is a closed normal subgroup. 
It follows that the quotient group  is totally disconnected.

Closure and compactness 

In any commutative topological group, the product (assuming the group is multiplicative)  of a compact set  and a closed set  is a closed set. 

Every discrete subgroup of a Hausdorff commutative topological group is closed.

Isomorphism theorems 

The isomorphism theorems from ordinary group theory are not always true in the topological setting. 
This is because a bijective homomorphism need not be an isomorphism of topological groups. 

For example, a native version of the first isomorphism theorem is false for topological groups: if  is a morphism of topological groups (that is, a continuous homomorphism), it is not necessarily true that the induced homomorphism  is an isomorphism of topological groups; it will be a bijective, continuous homomorphism, but it will not necessarily be a homeomorphism. In other words, it will not necessarily admit an inverse in the category of topological groups. 

The third isomorphism theorem, however, is true more or less verbatim for topological groups, as one may easily check.

Hilbert's fifth problem 

There are several strong results on the relation between topological groups and Lie groups. 
First, every continuous homomorphism of Lie groups  is smooth. 
It follows that a topological group has a unique structure of a Lie group if one exists. 
Also, Cartan's theorem says that every closed subgroup of a Lie group is a Lie subgroup, in particular a smooth submanifold.

Hilbert's fifth problem asked whether a topological group  that is a topological manifold must be a Lie group. 
In other words, does  have the structure of a smooth manifold, making the group operations smooth? 
As shown by Andrew Gleason, Deane Montgomery, and Leo Zippin, the answer to this problem is yes. 
In fact,  has a real analytic structure. 
As a result, the solution to Hilbert's fifth problem reduces the classification of topological groups that are topological manifolds to an algebraic problem, albeit a complicated problem in general.

The theorem also has consequences for broader classes of topological groups. First, every compact group (understood to be Hausdorff) is an inverse limit of compact Lie groups. 
(One important case is an inverse limit of finite groups, called a profinite group. For example, the group  of p-adic integers and the absolute Galois group of a field are profinite groups.) 
Furthermore, every connected locally compact group is an inverse limit of connected Lie groups. 
At the other extreme, a totally disconnected locally compact group always contains a compact open subgroup, which is necessarily a profinite group. 
(For example, the locally compact group  contains the compact open subgroup , which is the inverse limit of the finite groups  as ' goes to infinity.)

Representations of compact or locally compact groups 

Group actions and representation theory are particularly well understood for compact groups, generalizing what happens for finite groups. 
For example, every finite-dimensional (real or complex) representation of a compact group is a direct sum of irreducible representations. 
An infinite-dimensional unitary representation of a compact group can be decomposed as a Hilbert-space direct sum of irreducible representations, which are all finite-dimensional; this is part of the Peter–Weyl theorem. 
For example, the theory of Fourier series describes the decomposition of the unitary representation of the circle group  on the complex Hilbert space . 

The irreducible representations of all compact connected Lie groups have been classified. 
In particular, the character of each irreducible representation is given by the Weyl character formula.

More generally, locally compact groups have a rich theory of harmonic analysis, because they admit a natural notion of measure and integral, given by the Haar measure. 
Every unitary representation of a locally compact group can be described as a direct integral of irreducible unitary representations. 
(The decomposition is essentially unique if  is of Type I, which includes the most important examples such as abelian groups and semisimple Lie groups.) 

The irreducible unitary representations of a locally compact group may be infinite-dimensional. 
A major goal of representation theory, related to the Langlands classification of admissible representations, is to find the unitary dual (the space of all irreducible unitary representations) for the semisimple Lie groups. 

For a locally compact abelian group , every irreducible unitary representation has dimension 1. 
In this case, the unitary dual  is a group, in fact another locally compact abelian group. 
For example, the dual group of the integers  is the circle group , while the group  of real numbers is isomorphic to its own dual.

By contrast, representation theory for topological groups that are not locally compact has so far been developed only in special situations, and it may not be reasonable to expect a general theory. 
For example, there are many abelian Banach–Lie groups for which every representation on Hilbert space is trivial.

Homotopy theory of topological groups 

Topological groups are special among all topological spaces, even in terms of their homotopy type. 
One basic point is that a topological group  determines a path-connected topological space, the classifying space  (which classifies principal -bundles over topological spaces, under mild hypotheses). 
Some of these restrictions hold in the broader context of H-spaces.

For example, the fundamental group of a topological group  is abelian. 
Also, for any field k, the cohomology ring  has the structure of a Hopf algebra. 
In view of structure theorems on Hopf algebras by Heinz Hopf and Armand Borel, this puts strong restrictions on the possible cohomology rings of topological groups. 

Moreover, a connected Lie group  has a maximal compact subgroup K, which is unique up to conjugation, and the inclusion of K into  is a homotopy equivalence. 
So describing the homotopy types of Lie groups reduces to the case of compact Lie groups. 
Since the hyperbolic plane is contractible, the inclusion of the circle group into  is a homotopy equivalence.

Finally, compact connected Lie groups have been classified by Wilhelm Killing, Élie Cartan, and Hermann Weyl. 
As a result, there is an essentially complete description of the possible homotopy types of Lie groups. 
For example, a compact connected Lie group of dimension at most 3 is either a torus, the group SU(2) (diffeomorphic to the 3-sphere ), or its quotient group  (diffeomorphic to ).

Complete topological group

Information about convergence of nets and filters, such as definitions and properties, can be found in the article about filters in topology.

Canonical uniformity on a commutative topological group

This article will henceforth assume that any topological group that we consider is an additive commutative topological group with identity element 

That is, it is the upward closure of the following prefilter on  

where this prefilter forms what is known as a base of entourages of the canonical uniformity. 

For a commutative additive group  a fundamental system of entourages  is called a translation-invariant uniformity if for every   if and only if  for all  A uniformity  is called translation-invariant if it has a base of entourages that is translation-invariant.

The canonical uniformity on any commutative topological group is translation-invariant.
The same canonical uniformity would result by using a neighborhood basis of the origin rather the filter of all neighborhoods of the origin.
Every entourage  contains the diagonal  because 
<li>If  is symmetric (that is) then  is symmetric (meaning that ) and

Cauchy prefilters and nets

The general theory of uniform spaces has its own definition of a "Cauchy prefilter" and "Cauchy net." For the canonical uniformity on  these reduces down to the definition described below.

If  then the image of this net under the addition map  denotes the sum of these two nets:

and similarly their difference is defined to be the image of the product net under the subtraction map:

A net  in an additive topological group  is called a Cauchy net if

 for all indices  

A Cauchy sequence is a Cauchy net that is a sequence.

A prefilter  on an additive topological group  called a Cauchy prefilter if it satisfies any of the following equivalent conditions: 
 in  where  is a prefilter.
 in  where  is a prefilter equivalent to 
and if  is commutative then also:

Complete commutative topological group

A subset  of a topological group  is called a complete subset if it satisfies any of the following equivalent conditions: 
Every Cauchy prefilter  on  converges to at least one point of 
 If  is Hausdorff then every prefilter on  will converge to at most one point of  But if  is not Hausdorff then a prefilter may converge to multiple points in  The same is true for nets.
Every Cauchy filter  on  converges to at least one point of 

 As a consequence, if a commutative topological group  is not Hausdorff, then every subset of the closure of  say  is complete (since it is clearly compact and every compact set is necessarily complete).
 This example also shows that complete subsets (indeed, even compact subsets) of a non-Hausdorff space may fail to be closed (for example, if  then  is closed if and only if ).

A commutative topological group  is called a complete group if any of the following equivalent conditions hold:
 is complete as a subset of itself.
Every Cauchy net in  converges to at least one point of 
 This implies that every locally compact commutative topological group is complete.
When endowed with its canonical uniformity,  becomes is a complete uniform space.

A topological group is called sequentially complete if it is a sequentially complete subset of itself.

is a neighborhood basis at the origin in 

Let  and  be topological groups,  and  be a map. Then  is uniformly continuous if for every neighborhood  of the origin in  there exists a neighborhood  of the origin in  such that for all  if  then

Generalizations 

Various generalizations of topological groups can be obtained by weakening the continuity conditions:
 A quasitopological group is a semitopological group in which the function mapping elements to their inverses is also continuous.
 A paratopological group is a group with a topology such that the group operation is continuous.

See also

Notes

Citations

References 

 
 
 
 
 
 
 
 
 
 
 
 
  
 
 
 
 

 
Lie groups
Fourier analysis